The Mudbaden Sulphur Springs Company is a two-story brick Classical Revival spa building built near sulfur-rich springs which were advertised to be a cure for ailments including rheumatism, hypertension, liver disease, and gout. Located near Jordan, Minnesota, United States, it is listed on the National Register of Historic Places. Clients would bathe in mud dug up from the Minnesota River bed. The building is currently used as a public safety training center.

The spa was built by Ole Rosendahl who lived on the property. He was a miller in Minneapolis.

References

Buildings and structures in Scott County, Minnesota
Commercial buildings completed in 1915
Commercial buildings on the National Register of Historic Places in Minnesota
Spas
National Register of Historic Places in Scott County, Minnesota